Giovanni Bellini (c. 1430 – 29 November 1516) was an Italian Renaissance painter, probably the best known of the Bellini family of Venetian painters. He was raised in the household of Jacopo Bellini, formerly thought to have been his father, but now that familial generational relationship is questioned. An older brother, Gentile Bellini was more highly regarded than Giovanni during his lifetime, but the reverse is true today. His brother-in-law was Andrea Mantegna.

Giovanni Bellini was considered to have revolutionized Venetian painting, moving it toward a more sensuous and colouristic style. Through the use of clear, slow-drying oil paints, Giovanni created deep, rich tints and detailed shadings. His sumptuous coloring and fluent, atmospheric landscapes had a great effect on the Venetian painting school, especially on his pupils Giorgione and Titian.

Life

Early career 

Giovanni Bellini was born in Venice. The painter Jacopo Bellini had long been considered Giovanni's father, but the art historian Daniel Wallace Maze has advanced the theory that in fact, Jacopo was his much elder brother. Nonetheless, Giovanni was brought up in Jacopo's house, and always lived and worked in the closest fraternal relation with his elder brother, Gentile. Up until the age of nearly thirty we find in his work a depth of religious feeling and human pathos which is his own. His paintings from the early period are all executed in the old tempera method: the scene is softened by a new and beautiful effect of romantic sunrise color (as, for example, in the St. Jerome in the Desert).

In a changed and more personal manner, he drew Dead Christ paintings (In these days one of the master's most frequent themes e.g. Dead Christ Supported by the Madonna and St. John, or Pietà). with less harshness of contour, a broader treatment of forms and draperies and less force of religious feeling. Giovanni's early works have often been linked both compositionally and stylistically to those of Andrea Mantegna, his brother-in-law.

In 1470 Giovanni received his first appointment to work along with his elder brother, Gentile, and other artists in the Scuola di San Marco, where among other subjects he was commissioned to paint a Deluge with Noah's Ark. None of the master's works of this kind, whether painted for the various schools or confraternities or for the ducal palace, has survived.

Maturity 

To the decade following 1470 must probably be assigned the Transfiguration now in the Capodimonte Museum of Naples, repeating with greatly ripened powers and in a much serener spirit the subject of his early effort at Venice.

Also likely from this period is the great altar-piece of the Coronation of the Virgin at Pesaro, which would seem to be his earliest effort in a form of art previously almost monopolized in Venice by the rival school of the Vivarini.

As is the case with a number of his brother, Gentile's public works of the period, many of Giovanni's great public works are now lost. The still more famous altar-piece painted in tempera for a chapel in the church of S. Giovanni e Paolo, where it perished along with Titian's Peter Martyr and Tintoretto's Crucifixion in the disastrous fire of 1867.

After 1479–1480 much of Giovanni's time and energy must also have been taken up by his duties as conservator of the paintings in the great hall of the Doge's Palace. The importance of this commission can be measured by the payment Giovanni received: he was awarded, first the reversion of a broker's place in the Fondaco dei Tedeschi, and afterward, as a substitute, a fixed annual pension of eighty ducats. Beside repairing and renewing the works of his predecessors, he was commissioned to paint a number of new subjects, six or seven in all, in further illustration of the part played by Venice in the wars of Frederick Barbarossa and the pope. These works, executed with much interruption and delay, were the object of universal admiration while they lasted, but not a trace of them survived the fire of 1577; neither have any other examples of his historical and processional compositions come down, enabling us to compare his manner in such subjects with that of his brother Gentile.

Of the other, the religious class of his work, including both altar-pieces with many figures and simple Madonnas, a considerable number have been preserved. They show him gradually throwing off the last restraints of the Quattrocento manner; gradually acquiring a complete mastery of the new oil medium introduced in Venice by Antonello da Messina about 1473, and mastering with its help all, or nearly all, the secrets of the perfect fusion of colors and atmospheric gradation of tones. The old intensity of pathetic and devout feeling gradually fades away and gives place to a noble, if more worldly, serenity and charm. The enthroned Virgin and Child (such as the one at left) become tranquil and commanding in their sweetness; the personages of the attendant saints gain in power, presence and individuality; enchanting groups of singing and viol-playing angels symbolize and complete the harmony of the scene. The full splendour of Venetian color invests alike the figures, their architectural framework, the landscape and the sky.

High Renaissance 

An interval of some years, no doubt chiefly occupied with work in the Hall of the Great Council, seems to separate the San Giobbe Altarpiece, and that of the church of San Zaccaria at Venice. Formally, the works are very similar, so a comparison between serves to illustrate the shift in Bellini's work over the last decade of the fifteenth century. Both paintings are of the Holy Conversation (sacred conversation between the Madonna and Saints) type. Both show the Madonna seated on a throne (thought to allude to the throne of Solomon), between classicizing columns. Both place the holy figures beneath a golden mosaicked half dome that recalls the Byzantine architecture in the basilica of St. Mark.

In the later work Bellini depicts the Virgin surrounded by (from left): St. Peter holding his keys and the Book of Wisdom; the virginal St. Catherine and St. Lucy closest to the Virgin, each holding a martyr's palm and her implement of torture (Catherine a breaking wheel, and Lucy a dish with her eyes); St. Jerome, with a book symbolizing his work on the Vulgate.

Stylistically, the lighting in the San Zaccaria piece has become so soft and diffuse that it makes that in the San Giobbe appear almost raking in contrast. Giovanni's use of the oil medium had matured, and the holy figures seem to be swathed in a still, rarefied air. The San Zaccaria is considered perhaps the most beautiful and imposing of all Giovanni's altarpieces, and is dated 1505, the year following that of Giorgione's Madonna of Castelfranco.

Other late altarpiece with saints include that of the church of San Francesco della Vigna at Venice, 1507; that of La Corona at Vicenza, a Baptism of Christ in a landscape, 1510; and that of San Giovanni Crisostomo at Venice of 1513.

Of Giovanni's activity in the interval between the altar-pieces of San Giobbe and San Zaccaria, there are a few minor works left, although the great mass of his output perished with the fire of the Doge's Palace in 1577. The last ten or twelve years of the master's life saw him besieged with more commissions than he could well complete. Already in the years 1501–1504 the marchioness Isabella Gonzaga of Mantua had experienced great difficulty in obtaining delivery from him of a painting of the Madonna and Saints (now lost) for which part payment had been made in advance.

In 1505 she endeavoured through Cardinal Bembo to obtain from him another painting, this time of a secular or mythological character. What the subject of this piece was, or whether it was delivered, we do not know.

Albrecht Dürer, visiting Venice for a second time in 1506, describes Giovanni Bellini as still the best painter in the city, and as full of all courtesy and generosity toward foreign brethren of the brush.

In 1507 Bellini's brother Gentile died, and Giovanni completed the painting of the Preaching of St. Mark which his brother had left unfinished; a task on the fulfillment of which the bequest by the elder brother to the younger of Jacopo's sketch-book had been made conditional.

In 1513 Giovanni's position as sole master (since the death of Gentile and of Alvise Vivarini) in charge of the paintings in the Hall of the Great Council was threatened by one of his former pupils. Young Titian desired a share of the same undertaking, to be paid for on the same terms. Titian's application was granted, then after a year rescinded, and then after another year or two granted again; and the aged master must no doubt have undergone some annoyance from his sometime pupil's proceedings. In 1514 Giovanni undertook to paint The Feast of the Gods for the duke Alfonso I of Ferrara, but died in 1516.

Bellini died on 29 November 1516. The date is given by Marin Sanudo on his diary. He was interred in the Basilica di San Giovanni e Paolo, a traditional burial place of the doges.

Assessment

Both in the artistic and in the worldly sense, the career of Bellini was, on the whole, very prosperous. His long career began with Quattrocento styles, but matured into the progressive post-Giorgione Renaissance styles. He lived to see his own school far outshine that of his rivals, the Vivarini of Murano; he embodied, with growing and maturing power, all the devotional gravity and much also of the worldly splendour of the Venice of his time; and he saw his influence propagated by a host of pupils, two of whom at least, Giorgione and Titian, equaled or even surpassed their master. Bellini outlived Giorgione by five years; Titian, as we have seen, challenged him, claiming an equal place beside his teacher. Other pupils of the Bellini studio included Girolamo Galizzi da Santacroce, Vittore Belliniano, Rocco Marconi, Andrea Previtali and possibly Bernardino Licinio.

Bellini was essential to the development of the Italian Renaissance for his incorporation of aesthetics from Northern Europe. Significantly influenced by Antonello da Messina and contemporary trends such as oil painting, Bellini introduced the pala, or single-panel altarpieces, to Venetian society with his work Coronation of the Virgin. Certain details in this piece, such as breaks in the modeling of figures and shadows, imply that Bellini was still working to master the use of oil. This painting also differs from previous coronation scenes as it appears as a "window" to a natural scene, and excludes the typical accompanying paradise hosts. The simple scenery allows viewers to relate with more ease to the scene itself than before, reflecting Alberti's humanist and inventio concepts. He also used the disguised symbolism integral to the Northern Renaissance. Bellini was able to master the Antonello style of oil painting and surface texture, and to use this skill to create a refined and distinctly Venetian approach to painting. He blends this new technique with Venetian and the Byzantine traditions (previously influencing art in the city) of iconography and color to create a spiritual theme not found in Antonello's pieces. The realism of oil painting coupled with the religious traditions of Venice were unique elements to Bellini's style, which set him apart as one of the most innovative painters in the Venetian Renaissance. As demonstrated in such works as St. Francis in Ecstasy  (c. 1480) and the San Giobbe Altarpiece (c. 1478), Bellini makes use of religious symbolism through natural elements, such as grapevines and rocks. Yet his most important contribution to art lies in his experimentation with the use of color and atmosphere in oil painting.

The Bellini cocktail is named in his honor.

Spanish Museums own a scarce, but high-quality, presence of his works. The Prado Museum owns a Virgin and child between two Saints, with the collaboration of the workshop. The Thyssen-Bornemisza Museum preserves a Nunc Dimittis, and The Real Academia de Bellas Artes de San Fernando holds a Saviour.

References

Further reading
 Roger Fry, Giovanni Bellini (At the Sign of the Unicorn, 1899; Ursus Press, 1995).
 Peter Humfrey, Giovanni Bellini: An Introduction (Marsilio Editori, 2021).
 Oskar Batschmann, Giovanni Bellini (London, Reaktion Books, 2008).
 Rona Goffen, Giovanni Bellini (Yale University Press, 1989).
 Carolyn C. Wilson (ed.), Examining Giovanni Bellini: An Art "More Human and More Divine" (Brepols, 2015).

External links

 Giovanni Bellini biography, style and critical reception
 Giovanni Bellini in "A World History of Art"
 The National Gallery
 Web Gallery of Art
 Biblical art by Bellini
 National Gallery of Art
 Masters in Art online
Carl Brandon Strehlke, "Virgin and Child by Giovanni Bellini (cat. 165)" in The John G. Johnson Collection: A History and Selected Works, a Philadelphia Museum of Art free digital publication.

Italian Renaissance painters
Quattrocento painters
Painters from Venice
1430s births
1516 deaths
Italian male painters
15th-century Italian painters
16th-century Italian painters
15th-century Venetian people
16th-century Venetian people
Sibling artists
Catholic painters
Burials at Santi Giovanni e Paolo, Venice

Year of birth uncertain